Mama Bagunnava ( Father-in-law, Are You Fine) is a 1997 Telugu-language comedy film, produced by Jayakrishna under the Jayakrishna Movies banner and directed by Kodi Ramakrishna. It stars Rajendra Prasad, Naresh, Rambha, Mohini, Bhanupriya  and music composed by Vidyasagar. The film is remake of the 1994 Tamil movie Vanaja Girija which itself was a remake of 1974 Tamil movie Engamma Sapatham which had already been remade earlier in Telugu in 1975 as Ammayila Sapatham. The film was recorded as a flop at the box office.

Plot
The film begins with avaricious Dhanumjayam a millionaire, who leads a happy family life with his wife Sundarambal Iyer, two sons Gopala Krishna a veterinarian & Janakiram, a doctor. In the past, Dhanumjayam swindled his Manager Prakash Rao by conspiring that he heisted and absconded with the workers' bonus amount. So accordingly, Prakash Rao's wife Parvathamma & two daughters are humiliated and blacklisted by the public. At present, Jaya & Vijaya daughters of Prakash Rao decide to take avenge by coupling up with his simpleton sons. The rest of the story is a comic tale, that how Jaya & Vijaya teach a lesson to Dhanumjayam and prove their father's innocence with the help of a maid Gowri.

Cast
Rajendra Prasad as Gopala Krishna
Naresh as Janaki Ram
Rambha as Jaya
Mohini as Vijaya
Kota Srinivasa Rao as Dhanumjayam
Brahmanandam as Compounder
Costume Krishna as Thokku
Tanikella Bharani as Priest
Rallapalli as Police Inspector
Suthi Velu as Talupulu
Eeswar Rao as Prakash Rao
Bhanupriya as Gowri
Kovai Sarala as Sundarambal Iyer
Subha as Parvathamma

Soundtrack

Music composed by Vidyasagar. Music released on Supreme Music Company.

Other
 VCDs and DVDs on - VOLGA Videos, Hyderabad

References

External links

Indian comedy-drama films
Films directed by Kodi Ramakrishna
Films scored by Vidyasagar
Telugu remakes of Tamil films
1990s Telugu-language films
1997 comedy-drama films
1997 films